HMS Sparrow was a modified Black Swan-class sloop of the Royal Navy. She was laid down by William Denny and Brothers, Dumbarton on 30 November 1944, launched on 16 February 1946 and commissioned on 16 December 1946, with the pennant number U71.

Construction and career
Commissioned in 1946, she therefore did not experience the fighting of the Second World War.

HMS Sparrow served in the Royal Navy for the North America and West Indies Station. She remained at this station outside of returning to the United Kingdom for a return to service until 1953, when he left for the Far East to join the 3rd flotilla of frigates. Her brief service there includes a period of service with the Royal Navy elements of the UN Task Force deployed off the west coast of Korea.

In January 1951, after the end of the Korean War, he was redeployed to the South Atlantic until March 1956 when he returned to the United Kingdom to be transferred to the Portsmouth reserve. Registered on the withdrawal list in 1957, it was sold to BISCO for dismantling by Metal Industries and arrived at the demolition site in Charlestown on 26 May 1958.

References

Further reading 
 
 
 
 

 

Black Swan-class sloops
Sloops of the United Kingdom
1946 ships
Korean War sloops of the United Kingdom